Skály may refer to:

 Skály (Písek District), a village in the Czech Republic
 Skály (Strakonice District), a village in the Czech Republic